Kaznac was a court title of the state employee in medieval Bosnia and Serbia who was in charge for the treasury in the territory under his jurisdiction — kaznačina (казначина). The name of the title is derived from Serbo-Croatian word kazna. The kaznac was a financial-taxation service, translated into Latin camerarius (itself rendered "chamberlain").

In the Dečani chrysobulls, King Stefan Dečanski (r. 1321–1331) mentioned that the court dignitaries present at the Dečani assembly were the kaznac, tepčija, vojvoda, sluga and stavilac.

The title of veliki kaznac (велики казнац, "grand kaznac") was later transformed into protovestijar.

List of title holders

Serbia
Vlado, served between 1274 and 1279
Prvoslav Radojević ( 1280), served Helen of Anjou.
Mrnjan (fl. 1288), served Helen of Anjou at the court at Trebinje.
Miroslav (fl. 1306), kaznac, served Stefan Milutin.
Jovan Dragoslav (fl. 1300–15), kaznac (1300), then veliki kaznac (1315), served Stefan Milutin.
Dmitar, served Stefan Milutin and Stefan Dečanski (r. 1321–31)
Baldovin (fl. 1325–33), served Stefan Dečanski (r. 1321–31)
Gradislav Borilović, served Stefan Dušan.
Pribac, served Stefan Dušan (r. 1331–55).
Bogdan (fl. 1363), kaznac in the service of Emperor Uroš V
Tolislav

Bosnia
Krasoje, served around 1378 as the last known kaznac of Bosnia and the founder of noble family Kresojevic.

See also 
Serbian noble titles in the Middle Ages

References

Sources

 
Serbian noble titles
Government of the Serbian Empire
Economy of Serbia in the Middle Ages
Kingdom of Serbia (medieval)
13th century in Serbia
14th century in Serbia
Court titles of medieval Bosnia
Tax officials
Historical economic occupations